Cran may refer to:
C-RAN, cellular network architecture
CRAN (R programming language)
Cran (unit), of uncleaned herring
Representative Council of France's Black Associations

Surname
Chris Cran (born 1949), a Canadian painter
James Cran (born 1944), a British politician

Places
Rivière des Sept Crans, a river in Quebec, Canada
Rivière du Cran, a river in Quebec, Canada